Jared X. Van Snellenberg (born December 26, 1980) is a Canadian psychiatry professor focusing on schizophrenia neuroimaging research and former child actor. Best known for his role in Happy Gilmore, Van Snellenberg works as an assistant professor of psychiatry at the Renaissance School of Medicine at Stony Brook University.

Early life and education 
Van Snellenberg was born in Vancouver, British Columbia, Canada. He earned a Bachelor of Arts degree in psychology from Simon Fraser University, followed by a Master of Arts, Master of Philosophy, and PhD in psychology from Columbia University.

Career 
He is best known for his role as Adam Sandler's first caddy in Happy Gilmore, with his character drawing comparisons to professional golfer Will Zalatoris. His academic work primarily involves functional neuroimaging research into working memory in schizophrenia, and the development and use of techniques for meta-analysis.

Filmography

Film

Television

References

Canadian male film actors
Living people
1980 births